Holy Ship! Is an annual electronic dance music festival previously held aboard a 4,000+ capacity cruise ship, with two back to back sailings leaving out of Port Canaveral, FL with stops in the Bahamas originally set up by Destructo and eventually absolved by Insomniac records after infighting. The event was cancelled in 2019 due to the COVID-19 pandemic and ,the organizers were exploring dates late in 2020 or early 2021. The festival returned in January of 2020, at the Hard Rock Resort in Punta Cana, no longer holding the festival on a cruise ship.

Itinerary 
The cruise leaves out of Port Canaveral and travels to the Bahamas, making a stop on a private island for an all-day beach party and then either spending a day at sea or stopping in Nassau, Bahamas prior to arriving back to Cape Canaveral. The event is put on by music production companies Cloud 9 Adventures, HARD, and The Bowery Presents.

The private island party features a daytime dance party, with an un-announced artist arriving by helicopter and a lineup of DJs performing on the island. Historically, the event has sold out in the pre-booking phase, in which previous guests receive a token and are allowed to book prior to a general on-sale. Previous headliners for the festival cruise include Skrillex, Knife Party, A-Trak,  Zedd, Flume, Boys Noize, Rusko, Steve Aoki, Fatboy Slim, and Pretty Lights. Special guest appearances include Pharrell Williams, Kaskade, Disclosure, and Tiësto. In addition to music, the event hosts a variety of artist-led activities and workshops.

Non-profit division
The non-profit division of Holy Ship!, Positive Legacy, holds a silent auction during the event, in which the proceeds are donated to current Positive Legacy service projects. Positive Legacy is a 501(c)(3) charity organization committed to integrating live music and service by taking actions that positively impact people and the environment in the communities they visit. In addition to the auction, Positive Legacy also offers guests the chance to offset their carbon emissions from traveling on the cruise, as well as holding a donation drive for the Bahamas Children's Emergency Hostel in Nassau.

History

Holy Ship! Wrecked 2021 was held on land once again during Dec 3-7 in Riviera Maya, Mexico at Hard Rock Resort.

Holy Ship! Wrecked 2020 was held on land during Jan 22–26 in Punta Cana, Dominican Republic.

Holy Ship! 13.0, Jan 9-12, 2019

Holy Ship! 12.0, Jan 5–9, 2019

Holy Ship Jan 10-13 2018 (2 of 2, 11.0)Dates: January 10–13, 2018 (11.0)Vessel: Norwegian EpicPorts: Port Canaveral; Great Stirrup CayLineup: AC SLATER, ALISON WONDERLAND, J. WORRA, SNAILS, JUDGE, JAUZ, LATMUN, 4B, JACK BEATS, PHLEGMATIC DOGS, KRANE, WORTHY, JUSTIN MARTIN, NANCY WHANG, MALL GRAB, CUT SNAKE, THEE MIKE B, REZZ, CHRIS LAKE, GLADIATOR, LOUIS FUTON, TAIKI NULIGHT, COOKIE MONSTA, JOYRYDE, SOLARDO, MIND AGAINST, VOLAC, FISHER, GTA, DION TIMMER, TESTPILOT, MADAM X, LOUDPVCK, ASTRONOMAR, NGHTMRE, KIM ANN FOXMAN, WHAT SO NOT, GRAVES, CRANKDAT, VALENTINO KHAN, EKALI, EXCISION, MR. CARMACK, GINA TURNER, GREEN VELVET, SLANDER, NOISIA, ARDALAN, PEGGY GOU, SAGE ARMSTRONG, VINDATA, DOMBRESKY, SUBSET, THE BLACK MADONNA, CHRISTIAN MARTIN, CHRIS LORENZO, 12TH PLANET

Holy Ship Jan 6-10 2018 (1 of 2, 10.0)Dates: January 6–10, 2018 (10.0)Vessel: Norwegian EpicPorts: Port Canaveral; Great Stirrup CayLineup: AC SLATER, COYU, A-TRAK, REDLIGHT, CATZ 'N DOGZ, JOSH PAN, LOUIS THE CHILD, WALKER & ROYCE, MIJA, MALAA, KASKADE, KAYZO, GG MAGREE, JUSTIN MARTIN, YOTTO, BIG WILD, JUBILEE, JODY WISTERNOFF, AMTRAC, UNIIQU3, CHRIS LAKE, GODDOLLARS & PARADISE, MOON BOOTS, PARKER, WOLF + LAMB, JUSTIN CAY'S FANTASTIC VOYAGE, NICK MONACO, BORN DIRTY, CLAUDE VONSTROKE, GORGON CITY, GOLF CLAP, QRION, KITTENS, EPROM, SOUL CLAP, KEVIN SAUNDERSON, YULTRON, TENSNAKE, GINA TURNER, TCHAMI, YEHME2, WILL CLARKE, NOISIA, MEDASIN, FLAMINGOSIS, ROBOTAKI, BRANCHEZ & BIG WET, HOTEL GARUDA, GHASTLY, INFINITY INK, MK, MERCER, SUBSET, LINE 8, BAAUER, PARTY FAVOR, MANILA KILLA, LUTTRELL Special Guest: Virtual Self

Holy Ship Jan 2017 (2 of 2)
Dates: January 10–14, 2017 (9.0)
Vessel: Norwegian Epic
Ports: Port Canaveral; Great Stirrup Cay, Nassau, Bahamas
Lineup: Fatboy Slim, GRiZ, Claude VonStroke, Jauz, Maya Jone Coles, Hot Since 82, GTA, Gorgon City (DJ Set), Destructo, Getter, Justin Martin, Jack Beats, Felix Da Housecat, Mija, AC Slater, DJ Tennis, Slow Magic, Hannah Wants, Soul Clap, Motez, Chris Lorenzo, Wolf+Lamb, Ookay, Slushii, Herobust, Wax Motif, J. Phlip, Thugfucker, Giraffage, Justin Jay, Rezz, Hucci, Gerd Janson, Oshi, Doorly, Party Favor, Craze, Gina Turner, Kim Ann Foxman, Bot, Barclay Crenshaw, Kidnap Kid, Horse Meat Disco, Cut Snake, DJ Doc Martin, Stranger, Nick Monaco, Jerry Folk, Redlight, Golf Clap, Josh Pan, Newcleus (Live), Vincent, Marques Wyatt, Mr. Kool Aid, Bones, Dateless, Subset, and The Interns.

Holy Ship Jan 2017 (1 of 2)
Dates: January 6–10, 2017 (8.0)
Vessel: Norwegian Epic
Ports: Port Canaveral; Great Stirrup Cay, Nassau, Bahamas
Lineup: DJ Snake, Tchami, Duke Dumont, Boys Noize, A-Trak, Marshmello, Big Gigantic, Rudimental (DJ Set), Kill The Noise, Destructo, Justin Martin, NGHTMRE, Jai Wolf, Snails, Rüfüs Du Sol, Bob Moses, Busy P, Anna Lunoe,
Malaa, Mercer, Slander, Louis The Child, Troyboi, Totally Enormous Extinct Dinosaurs (DJ Set), Wax Motif, Jimmy Edgar, Danny Daze, Ghastly, Shiba San, Jonas Rathsman, Stwo, Amtrac, Kastle, Nina Las Vegas, Joyryde, Curses, Louisahhh, Hotel Garuda, Ardalan, Drezo, Unlike Pluto, Gina Turner, Spank Rock Vs. Lil Internet, Djedjotronic, Christian Martin, Rory Phillips, Will Clarke, KaneHoller, Point Point, Manila Killa, Mambo Brothers, Sita Abellan, Kaz James, Aazar, Nvoy, Jstjr, Cardopusher, Gunslinger, Cameron Graham, Dena Amy, Bones, The Interns, and DJ Black Frames.

Holy Ship! February 2016
Dates: February 10–13, 2016 (7.0)
Vessel: MSC Divina
Ports: Miami, FL; Grand Bahama Island, Bahamas
Lineup: DJ Snake, Chromeo, Porter Robinson, RL Grime B2B Baauer, Boys Noize, Flux Pavilion, Tchami, What So Not, Cashmere Cat, Justin Martin, Thomas Jack, Destructo, Gramatik, Snakehips, Jauz, Gaslamp Killer, Shiba San, Felix Da Housecat, Branchez, Trippy Turtle, DJ Tennis, Claptone, Mercer, Busy P, Soul Clap, DJ Dodger Stadium, Oliver, Alex Metric, Thugfucker, Anna Lunoe, J. Phlip, Jimmy Edgar, The M Machine, Danny Daze, Carmada, Wolf + Lamb, Coyu, Mija, Marshmello, Justin Jay, Jets, Ardalan, Will Clarke, SNBRN, Nina Las Vegas, Samo Sound Boy, Machinedrum, Hunter Siegel, Falcons, Reflex, Malaa, Rezz, Cory Enemy, Kittens, Vanilla Ace, Hoodboi, Thee Cool Cats, Kaz James, Promnite

Holy Ship Jan 2016
Dates: January 3–6, 2016 (6.0)
Vessel: MSC Divina
Ports: Miami, FL; Coco Cay, Bahamas
Lineup: Kaskade, Dillon Francis, Flosstradamus, Odesza, Steve Aoki, Robin Schulz, Tommy Trash, Griz, Rudimental (DJ set), Gorgon City (DJ set), Hudson Mohawke, Brodinski, Justin Martin, Destructo, MK, GTA, Bakermat (DJ set), Jack Beats, Kill the Nosie, Jackmaster, Ryan Hemsworth, Rustie, Valentino Khan, Lee Foss, Skream, Mr. Carmack, Slow Magic, Hannah Wants, Motez (producer), Djemba, Djemba, Lane 8, Peking Duk, Wax Motif, Patrick Topping, Riva Starr, AC Slater, Tommy Kruise, Doorly, Jai Wolf, Wiwek, AWE, Louisahhh!!!, Soy Sauce, Royal, Bot, Genghis Clan, Slumberjack, Brazzabelle, Eyes Everywhere, Billy Kenny, Penthouse Penthouse

Holy Ship Feb 2015
Dates: February 18–21, 2015 (5.0)
Vessel: MSC Divina
Ports: Miami, FL; Nassau, Bahamas; Grand Bahama Island, Bahamas
Lineup: Skrillex, Fatboy Slim, Baauer, DJ Snake, Tommy Trash, Basement Jaxx (DJ set), Claude Vonstroke, Ty Dolla $ign, DJ Mustard, Jack Beats, Busy P, Green Velvet, Sub Focus, Mat Zo, Breakbot, Brodinski, Destructo, Justin Martin, Alex Metric, Galantis, Cajmere, Tchami, AraabMuzik, Martin Buttrich, Lee Foss Feat. Anabel Englund, Soul Clap, Mercer, Huxley, The M Machine, J. Phlip, AC Slater, Kill Frenzy, Justin Jay, Milo & Otis, Valentino Khan, Louisahhh!!!, Curses, Boston Bun, Wax Motif, Kastle, Anna Lunoe, Club Cheval, Shift K3y, Panteros 666, So Me, Amtrac, DJ Pone, Sweater Beats, Tommy Kruise, Posso, Cut Snake. Special Guest: Kaskade

Holy Ship Jan 2015
Dates: January 3–6, 2015 (4.0)
Vessel: MSC Divina
Ports: Miami, FL; Coco Cay, Bahamas; Day at Sea
Lineup: Knife Party, Pretty Lights, Flume, Boys Noize, A-Trak, RL Grime, Maya Jane Coles, Laidback Luke, Duke Dumont, Armand Van Helden, Rudimental (DJ set), What So Not, Clockwork, Busy P, Griz, Annie Mac, Justin Martin, Destructo, Alex Metric, Dusky, Odesza, Oliver, Rustie, Henry Fong, Gorgon City, Cyril Hahn, Salva, Jimmy Edgar, Congorock, Craze, Friend Within, Branchez, Spank Rock, DJ Sliink, Shiba San, Sharam Jey, Snakehips, DJ Falcon, Kidnap Kid, Hannah Wants, Motez, Teki Latex, Gina Turner, Wax Motif, Ape Drums, Doorly, Djedjotronic, Vanilla Ace, Cory Enemy, Yogi. Special Guest: Disclosure

Holy Ship!!!
Dates: January 9–12, 2014 (3.0)
Vessel: MSC Divina
Ports: Miami, FL; Coco Cay, Bahamas
Lineup: Skrillex, Duck Sauce, Diplo, Boys Noize, Zedd, Laidback Luke, A-Trak, Zeds Dead, Dillon Francis, Baauer, Chromeo (DJ set), Disclosure (DJ set), Armand Van Helden, Claude VonStroke, Flosstradamus, Skream, Flume, RL Grime, Brodinksi, Crookers, Alvin Risk, Destructo, Justin Martin, Clockwork, GTA, Alex Metric, Oliver, Breach, Just Blaze, Griz, Gramatik, Ryan Hemsworth, Cyril Hahn, Djedjotronic, Strip Steve, TJR, Kill Frenzy, Amine Edge & Dance, French Fries, Gorgon City, Gina Turner, Green Lantern, Light Year, T. Williams, Jerome LOL, Samo Sound Boy, Katyranada, Liquid Todd. Special Guest Pharrell Williams

Holy Ship!!
Dates: January 4–7, 2013 (2.0)
Vessel: MSC Poesia
Ports: Ft. Lauderdale, FL; Nassau, Bahamas; Private Island, Bahamas
Lineup: Justice (DJ set), Boys Noize, Knife Party, Major Lazer, Diplo, A-Trak, Skream & Benga, Busy P, Jack Beats, Zedd, Crookers, 12th Planet, Dillon Francis, Tommy Trash, Digitalism (DJ set), Breakbot, Gesaffelstein, Brodinski, Kill The Noise, Alvin Rush, Claude VonStroke, Justin Martin, Big Gigantic, Destructo, Oliver, Eats Everything, L-Vis 1990, Bok Bok, J. Phlip, Jackmaster, Plastician, Girl Unit, Kingdom, Gina Turner, Rory Phillips, The Knocks. Special Guest: Skrillex

Holy Ship!
Dates: January 6–9, 2012 (1.0)
Vessel: MSC Poesia
Ports: Ft. Lauderdale, FL; Port Lucaya, Bahamas; Private Island, Bahamas
Lineup: Fatboy Slim,  Boys Noize, Laidback Luke, Rusko, Diplo, A-Trak, Steve Aoki, Skrillex, Tommy Lee & DJ Aero, Brodinski, Buraka Som Sistema, Gesaffelstein, Justin Martin, Zedd, DJ Craze, Dillon Francis, Housemister, Strip Steve, Djedjotronic, Destructo, Danny Brown, Egyptrixx, Rory Phillips, Club Cheval, Jason Bentley, Posso, Doorly, Oliver, Gina Turner, Nick Catchdubs, Arthur Baker, Contra, Mike Deuce, Blu Jemz, Lloydski

See also
List of festivals in Florida
List of electronic music festivals

References

External links

Electronic music festivals in the United States
Music cruises
Music festivals established in 2012
Electronic music festivals in the Bahamas
Winter events in the Bahamas
2012 establishments in Florida